Arthur Meredyth may refer to:
 Arthur Meredyth (died 1732), Member of Parliament for Navan (Parliament of Ireland constituency)
 Arthur Francis Meredyth (1726–1775), MP for Meath (Parliament of Ireland constituency)